The Church of St. Chrysogonus is a Roman Catholic church located in Zadar, Croatia, named after Saint Chrysogonus, the patron saint of the city.

The Romanesque church was consecrated by Lampridius, Archbishop of Zadar, in 1175. Built at the site of a Roman emporium, it replaced the Church of Saint Anthony the Hermit and is the only remaining part of a large medieval Benedictine abbey. In 1387, Elizabeth of Bosnia, the murdered queen dowager of Hungary and Dalmatia, was secretly buried in the church, where her body remained for three years until being moved to the Székesfehérvár Basilica. The construction of a bell tower began in 1485, but was abandoned in 1546 and never finished.

Sources
Crkva Sv. Krševana

External links 
St Chrysogonus’ Church

Buildings and structures completed in 1175
Basilica churches in Croatia
1175 establishments in Europe
Buildings and structures in Zadar
12th-century establishments in Croatia
Tourist attractions in Zadar